Greenwood Public Schools can refer to:
 Greenwood School District (Arkansas)
 Greenwood Public School District (Mississippi)
 Greenwood School District 50 (South Carolina)
 School District Of Greenwood (Wisconsin)